Roses Park, previously known as Rosarium or Ștefan Plavăț Park of Culture and Leisure, is an urban park in Timișoara, located north of the Bega River.

History 
The park was established and opened in 1891 on the occasion of the Agro-Industrial Exhibition in Southern Hungary. The floral arrangements were made by gardeners Wilhelm Mühle, Franz Niemetz and Benő Agátsy and were also visited by Emperor Franz Joseph. The park bore the emperor's name, but after World War I it was renamed Rosarium. The landscaping of the park started in 1929 by landscapers Árpád Mühle, Wilhelm Mühle's son, and Mihai Demetrovici, the head of the horticulture service in that period. The plan for the future Roses Park was presented on 13 May 1929, at a national congress of rose growers in Romania. The plan was drawn up by Árpád Mühle in the English style, with wide alleys, wooden canopies and round flower beds. The park was arranged between 1929–1934, when over 1,200 species and varieties of roses were planted here. The park, initially with an area of 25,170 m2, was maintained until 1938 with the help of the military personnel of the garrison, under the command of Ion Sâmboteanu. After 1938 the park came under the administration of the city. 

Shortly before World War II, the summer theater was built. It was destroyed by bombing in the summer of 1944 and was rebuilt after the war, being intended for outdoor performances. Later, academician Alexandru Borza, taking refuge in Cluj-Napoca after the Second Vienna Award with the entire Botanical Institute, tried to set up a botanical garden here, but the project could not be realized.

The last reorganization of the park dates from 2012, when, on an area of over 11,000 m2, the municipality planted 9,024 roses, 428 trees and shrubs and also rebuilt 12 pergolas, 77 benches and 12 Roman vases.

Design 
The current area of the park is 37,490 m2, of which lawn, trees and roses occupy 31,890 m2. 

The style in which the park was designed is typical regular, classic, with a predominance of curved lines. The land has a rectangular shape, in which were realized three areas of landscape attraction and two round lawns, with concentric sectors at the ends and a group of parterres with rectangular shapes, equipped with alveoles for placing roses, interspersed with visiting alleys. Overall, it is a mixed style, with a distinct separation between the former rosarium, which retains the regular, classic style and the rest of the park, arranged in an obvious landscape style.

Festivals 
In the park many cultural events are organized nowadays, such as the Festival of Hearts, the Festival of Ethnic Minorities, the Festival of Opera and Operetta and the Festival of Artisanal Gastronomy.

Gallery

References 

Parks in Timișoara